Darla Jane Gilroy is a British academic and former fashion designer. She was also one of the four "Blitz kids" featured in David Mallet's music video for David Bowie's 1980 number 1 hit "Ashes to Ashes".

After graduating from Saint Martin's School of Art, Gilroy set up her own design label, Darla Jane Gilroy, which had a shop on London's King's Road. Gilroy travelled extensively, manufacturing under license in Hong Kong and living in the Far East for four years. This work has been considered exemplary of what Black British designers brought to mainstream British fashion in the 80s and 90s, and consequently some of her work from this period has been featured in London's Victoria & Albert Museum. Her design work received considerable publicity when it was available, helping to define the glamorous, flamboyant style with which British fashion of the 80s and 90s is still associated.

Gilroy has had a long involvement with design education, both undergraduate and post graduate, as a visiting lecturer, external examiner and course advisor, teaching at Ravensbourne, Central Saint Martins College of Art and Design, the University of Westminster, Southampton University, University of East London, and most recently the University of the Arts.

She is currently the Programme Director for the Design and Craft group of courses at London College of Fashion. She has taught postgraduate students at The Royal College of Art in the School of Fashion and Textiles and has her own practice as a consultant designer and trend predictor.

In 1995 she became the Course Leader of the BA Hons in Footwear and Accessories Design and Product Development at Cordwainers College and in 1999 she became Head of Department and Subject Leader in Fashion at Winchester School of Art.

She has maintained her professional practice mostly through her design and trends consultancy, The Future Perfect, working to predict cultural trends for clients such as McCann Erickson advertising agency and Unilever.

References

Living people
Futurologists
Alumni of Saint Martin's School of Art
English people of Guyanese descent
Academics of Central Saint Martins
Fashion designers from London
British women fashion designers
Year of birth missing (living people)
Academics of Ravensbourne University London